Utal was a medieval village, later an abandoned place in  Győr county in Hungary, near to Bezi.

In 1519, Count György Cseszneky had estates in the village.

References
 Arcanum családtörténeti adattár
 Horváth Mihály: A magyar nemzet története
 Seidl-Bonitz-Hochegger: Zeitschrift für Niederösterreichischen Gymnasien XIV.

Populated places in Győr-Moson-Sopron County